George Hand Wright (1872–1951) was an American painter, illustrator and printmaker.

Life
Born in the Fox Chase section of Philadelphia, Pennsylvania, the son of a blacksmith, he attended the Spring Garden Institute, a local technical school, and was apprenticed to a lithographer. He studied at the Pennsylvania Academy of the Fine Arts under Robert Vonnoh, where his classmates included Robert Henri, John Sloan and William Glackens.

He moved to New York City, and his first illustration appeared in Scribner's Magazine in 1893. He illustrated a number of books, and his work soon appeared regularly in magazines such as Scribner's, Harper's, Collier's, The Saturday Evening Post, and others.

He married Anne Boylan, and in 1907 they settled in Westport, Connecticut. He became one of the founders of its artistic community. In mid-career, he turned from commercial illustration to watercolors, pastels and etchings.

He exhibited at the Pennsylvania Academy of the Fine Arts, the Brooklyn Society of Etchers, the Society of American Etchers, and a number of New York galleries. 
He was a member of the Society of American Etchers, the Society of Illustrators, the Salmagundi Club and the Westport Artists. 
In 1939, he was elected to the National Academy of Design.

Wright died in Westport in 1951.

The Library of Congress has a collection of more than one hundred of his illustrations. A biography, George Hand Wright: An Artist's Life Examined by Kirsten M. Jensen, was published in 2008.

Other artists named George Wright
Works by similarly-named artists are often misattributed to George Hand Wright:
George Frederick Wright (1828-1881), American portrait painter. A large collection of his work is at the Connecticut Historical Society.
George W. Wright (1834-1934), American painter of Victorian genre scenes. Examples of his work are at the Hudson River Museum.
George Wright (1860-1942), British equestrian painter.

References

Sources
Kirsten M. Jensen, George Hand Wright: An Artist's Life Examined, PEN Press, 2007,

External links

 
George Hand Wright at ArtNet.
George Hand Wright at AskArt.
George Hand Wright at 100 Years of Illustration
George Hand Wright illustrations at the Library of Congress
Illustrations from Norse Stories Retold From the Edda by Hamilton Wright Mabie, 1902.
 MyNDIR (My Norse Digital Image repository) illustrations by George Hand Wright from Norse Stories: Retold from the Eddas (1882). Clicking on the thumbnail will give you the full image and information concerning it.

1872 births
1951 deaths
Artists from Connecticut
American magazine illustrators
Artists from Philadelphia
National Academy of Design members
Pennsylvania Academy of the Fine Arts alumni
People from Westport, Connecticut
Presidents of the Society of Illustrators